Dendrobium gnomus is a species of flowering plant in the family Orchidaceae, native to the Solomon Islands and the  Santa Cruz Islands. It was first described in 1933 by Oakes Ames.

References

gnomus
Flora of the Santa Cruz Islands
Flora of the Solomon Islands (archipelago)
Plants described in 1933